The Afrigo Band is a musical band in Uganda. It is the longest-lasting musical group in the history of Uganda, having existed for 44 years by August 2019.

History
The band was formed by a group of eight musicians led by their band leader, vocalist, and alto saxophonist, Moses Matovu, who continued to lead the band on its 38th anniversary. Playing to their fans at home in Uganda, the group tours regularly in Europe and the United States to play to Ugandans in the Diaspora. He has been performing with the band since and is its leader, as of February 2015. The eight founding band members were:

 Moses Matovu
 Charles Ssekyanzi
 Jeff Sewava
 Paddy Nsubuga
 Paulo Serumagga
 Fred Luyombya
 Anthony Kyeyune
 Geoffrey Kizito

Band members
, all except one of the founding band members had died. The band recruited replacements whenever a member left or died. Members of the band, past and present, include:
 Moses Matovu - founder member, band leader, saxophonist, lead vocals, composer  
 Deo Mukungu - member, vocalist
 Herman Ssewanyana - congas
 Charles Ssekyanzi Mutagubya - vocalist, trumpet player, composer
 Mansur Bulegeya Akiki - tenor saxophonist
 Joanita Kawalya - vocalist, dancer
 Rachael Magoola - vocalist, dancer, composer
 Rashid Musoke - member
 Paul Serumaga - founder member
 Godfrey Mwambala - member
 Tony Sengo - member
 Tonny Ssenkebejje - solo guitarist
 Fred Kigozi - member
 Peter Bazanye - vocals
 Joe Tabula - vocals
 Frank Mbalire guitarist/vocals
 Edmond Ganja - guitarist/vocals
 Sammy Kasule - bassist/vocals
 Charles Busuulwa - bassist
 Eric Sabiiti - drummer
 Julious Nshaba - drummer
 Daniel Kaggwa - keyboards
 Isaac Zzimbe - drummer
 Jacinta Wamboga - dancer
 Sarah Namiyonga - dancer
 Aminye Rhoose - dancer

Discography
Some of the records and albums released by the band include the following:

Recent developments
In January 2015, Afrigo Band began regular performances at Club Silk, in Kampala's Industrial area, every Friday evening. Although the club attracts a predominantly young audience, with the arrival of Afrigo, Club Silk is expected to ring in more mature revelers, above the age of 40 years. In November 2015, the band celebrated its 40th anniversary with a sold-out concert at Hotel Africana, in Kampala.

See also

References

External links
  Afrigo: Uganda’s Greatest Band

Ugandan musical groups
1975 establishments in Uganda